Douglas James Redwood (1918 – after 1939) was a Welsh professional footballer who played as an outside forward. He joined Cardiff City from his hometown side Ebbw Vale in 1935 and made thirteen league appearances for the side. He later played for Walsall before joining Rochdale in 1939, where he ended his professional career following the outbreak of World War II.

References

1918 births
Date of death missing
Sportspeople from Ebbw Vale
Welsh footballers
Ebbw Vale F.C. players
Cardiff City F.C. players
Walsall F.C. players
Rochdale A.F.C. players
English Football League players
Association football forwards